Ocak is a Turkish surname and a given name. People with the name include:

Surname
 F. Tulga Ocak (1946–2019), Turkish academic
 Kamil Ocak (1914–1969), Turkish politician 
 Murat Ocak (born 1982), Turkish football player

Given name
 Ocak Işık Yurtçu (1945–2012), Turkish journalist

See also

 Ocak (disambiguation)

Turkish-language surnames
Turkish masculine given names